Empress Bian (卞皇后) may refer to the following empresses of the Cao Wei state:

Empress Dowager Bian (159–230), Cao Cao's wife and Cao Pi's mother
Empress Bian (Cao Mao's wife) ( 255), Cao Mao's wife
Empress Bian (Cao Huan's wife) ( 263), Cao Huan's wife

See also
Queen Bian ( 338–409), queen of the Western Qin state

Bian